Albion San Diego, formerly Albion SC Pros, is an American professional soccer team based in San Diego, California that currently plays in the National Independent Soccer Association, on the third tier of the United States soccer league system.

History 
ASC San Diego was formed in 2015 and played their first competitive season as a franchise in 2016, in the National Premier Soccer League.

2022: Going professional
On December 15, 2021, Albion announced a merger with San Diego 1904 FC of NISA, after that club lost a major source of financing. The new club was to compete in NISA as Albion San Diego, starting with the 2022 season.

Players

Current roster

Year-by-year

References

External links

Soccer clubs in San Diego
2015 establishments in California
Association football clubs established in 2015
National Premier Soccer League teams
National Independent Soccer Association teams